Chloe Smith is an American singer, multi-instrumental musician, and activist known for her role as one of the two frontsisters of Rising Appalachia — with older sister Leah Song — incorporating sultry vocals, rhythm, banjo, guitar, and fiddle into her work. Her music is based in the traditions of Southern soul and international roots music.

Smith has an interest in natural medicine and healing and engages in social activism, where she is involved in issues pertaining to the environment, racial inequality and cultural appropriation.

Early life and education 
Chloe Smith was born and grew up in Atlanta, Georgia in an artistic family. Her father, Andrew Hunter Smith, is a folk-sculptor and painter. Her mother, Jan Smith, is a jazz pianist and folk musician schooled in the traditions of southern Appalachian folk music who played fiddle with the Rosin Sisters.

Smith's musical education was nurtured by her mother, who ensured that both sisters received classical and jazz piano training for the most of their upbringing. Smith's mother also guided their training in vocals and harmony singing. Banjo, fiddle and guitar came later, after the sisters had left home and moved to Asheville, North Carolina.

Smith graduated from Henry W. Grady High School. She found high school to be a positive experience which made her more aware of the wide range of racial, financial and cultural diversity in the world. After graduation, Smith traveled for a year, returning when she felt she had spent too much time away from her sister Leah, who was traveling independently.

Activism

Smith's environmental activism like her music is rooted in her childhood. In an interview, speaking about the Appalachian fiddle camps and dances festivals her parents took her to as a child, she said:

An activist before she became a musician, she credits her father with inspiring her desire to combine art with activism in a spiritual way, saying:

Smith supports other causes in addition to environmental ones. She is particularly concerned about environmental destruction, racial inequality, and cultural appropriation, and Rising Appalachia has sung in support of the Occupy movement.

Musical career

In 2005, Smith, together with her sister Leah, decided to record their first album, Leah and Chloe, one afternoon in the basement studio of a friend. The album was meant as a gift for family and friends but they received so much support and recognition for it that they decided to officially start a band called Rising Appalachia. Smith said of the experience:

In the early days, the sisters busked in the French Quarter of New Orleans and elsewhere. They began to find their own natural interpretation of Appalachian music which brought together folk, soul, hip-hop, classical, southern gospel and other styles based on their upbringing on traditional Appalachian string band music, as well as on their exposure to urban music like hip-hop and jazz and the influence of roots music of all kinds which they experienced during their worldwide travels.

The sisters integrate live performance art into Rising Appalachia's shows. Speaking about this, Smith said:

Natural medicine and healing

Smith's interest in natural medicine and healing inspired the song "Medicine," released on Rising Applachia's 2015 album, Wider Circles. Speaking about the song in an interview, she said that the song "draws attention to the natural medicine and natural healing that we’ve experienced over the years," and "there is a new under layer of messaging of using these tools in nature that we have around us to heal ourselves and reconnect to the world we are living in."

Selected discography

With Rising Appalachia
 
 
 
 
 
 
  (live album)

Music videos (Rising Appalachia and other collaborations)

See also
Appalachian Center for Wilderness Medicine
Environmental issues in Appalachia
Environmental justice and coal mining in Appalachia
Social and economic stratification in Appalachia

References

Citations

Works cited

Further reading

External links
 
 
 

Year of birth missing (living people)
1980s births
Living people
21st-century American women musicians
American activists
American banjoists
American folk singers
American multi-instrumentalists
American women guitarists
American women singer-songwriters
Feminist musicians
Folk musicians from Georgia (U.S. state)
Guitarists from Georgia (U.S. state)
Musicians from Appalachia
Musicians from Atlanta
Rising Appalachia